Lully may refer to:

Places

Switzerland 
 Lully, Fribourg, a municipality
 Lully, Vaud, a municipality

France 
 Lully, Haute-Savoie

Antarctica 
 Lully Foothills

People 
 Jean-Baptiste Lully (1632–1687), Italian-born French opera composer of the Baroque period
 Louis Lully (1664–1734), his oldest son
 Jean-Baptiste Lully  (1665–1743), his second son
 Jean-Louis Lully (1667–1688), his third son
 Ramon Llull or Raymond Lully (c. 1230–1315), late medieval Spanish writer and philosopher